Bahraini may refer to:
 Something of, or related to Bahrain
 A person from Bahrain, or of Bahraini descent; see Baharna or Demographics of Bahrain 
 Bahraini culture
 Bahraini cuisine

See also 
 Bahrani Arabic
 List of Bahranis
 

Language and nationality disambiguation pages